is a 2014 Japanese drama film directed by Izuru Narushima. It was released on October 11. The film is based on the novel  by Akio Morisawa.

Cast
Sayuri Yoshinaga
Hiroshi Abe
Yūko Takeuchi
Shōfukutei Tsurube II

Reception
The film has grossed ¥512 million at the Japanese box office.

References

External links
  
 
 

2014 drama films
2010s Japanese films
Films directed by Izuru Narushima
Films set in Chiba Prefecture
Japanese drama films